A launch pad is an above-ground facility from which a rocket-powered missile or space vehicle is vertically launched. The term launch pad can be used to describe just the central launch platform (mobile launcher platform), or the entire complex (launch complex). The entire complex will include a launch mount or launch platform to physically support the vehicle, a service structure with umbilicals, and the infrastructure required to provide propellants, cryogenic fluids, electrical power, communications, telemetry, rocket assembly, payload processing, storage facilities for propellants and gases, equipment, access roads, and drainage.

Most launch pads include fixed service structures to provide one or more access platforms to assemble, inspect, and maintain the vehicle and to allow access to the spacecraft, including the loading of crew. The pad may contain a flame deflection structure to prevent the intense heat of the rocket exhaust from damaging the vehicle or pad structures, and a sound suppression system spraying large quantities of water may be employed. The pad may also be protected by lightning arresters. A spaceport typically includes multiple launch complexes and other supporting infrastructure.

A launch pad is distinct from a missile launch facility (or missile silo or missile complex), which also launches a missile vertically but is located underground in order to help harden it against enemy attack. 

The launch complex for liquid fueled rockets often has extensive ground support equipment including propellant tanks and plumbing to fill the rocket before launch. Cryogenic propellants (liquid oxygen oxidizer, and liquid hydrogen or liquid methane fuel) need to be continuously topped off (i.e., boil-off replaced) during the launch sequence (countdown), as the vehicle awaits liftoff. This becomes particularly important as complex sequences may be interrupted by planned or unplanned holds to fix problems.

Most rockets need to be supported and held down for a few seconds after ignition while the engines build up to full thrust. The vehicle is commonly held on the pad by hold-down arms or explosive bolts, which are triggered when the vehicle is stable and ready to fly, at which point all umbilical connections with the pad are released.

Transport of rockets to the pad 

.

Each launch site is unique, but a few broad types can be described by the means by which the space vehicle gets to the pad.

 Horizontally integrated rockets travel horizontally with the tail forward to the launch site on a transporter erector launcher and are then raised to the vertical position over the flame duct. Examples include all large Soviet rockets, including Soyuz, Proton, N1, and Energia. This method is also used by the SpaceX and Electron launch vehicles.
 Silo launched rockets are assembled inside of a missile silo. This method is only used by converted ICBMs due to the difficulty and expense of constructing a silo that can contain the forces of a rocket launch.
 Vertically integrated rockets can be assembled in a separate hangar on a mobile launcher platform (MLP). The MLP contains the umbilical structure and is carried to the launch site on a large vehicle called Crawler-transporter. Launch Complex 39 at the Kennedy Space Center is an example of a facility using this method. A similar system is used to launch Ariane 5 rockets at ELA-3 at Guiana Space Centre.
 Vertically assembled vehicles can also be transported on a mobile launcher platform resting on two parallel standard gauge railroad tracks that run from the integration building to launch area. This system is still in use for the Atlas V and future Vulcan.
 At SLC-6 and SLC-37, rockets are assembled on the launch mount. A windowless rail-mounted building encloses the launch pad and gantry to protect the vehicle from the elements, and for purposes of military secrecy. Prior to launch, the building is rolled away. This method is also used at Kagoshima for the M-V.
 The former Sea Launch service used the converted self-propelled oil drilling platform Ocean Odyssey to transport Zenit 3SL rockets horizontally to the Equator, and then to erect and launch them from a floating launch platform into geostationary transfer orbits.

See also 

 
 
 List of rocket launch sites
 Missile launch facility
 Non-rocket spacelaunch
 
 Rocket launch
 
 Spaceport

References 

Rocket launchers